Patricio Saavedra (born 11 January 1947) is a Chilean hurdler. He competed in the men's 110 metres hurdles at the 1968 Summer Olympics.

References

1947 births
Living people
Athletes (track and field) at the 1968 Summer Olympics
Chilean male hurdlers
Olympic athletes of Chile
Place of birth missing (living people)